Jacobo Morales (born 12 November 1934) is a Puerto Rican actor, poet, writer, playwright, filmmaker, and auteur. Many consider him the most influential film director in Puerto Rico's history.

Early life
Morales was born in the town of Lajas, Puerto Rico, to parents of Sephardic roots.

Career
He started acting in radio and theater when he was only 14 years old. He began working in television at its inception in 1954, working as an actor, writer and director. Some of his works include Desafiando a los Genios, Esto no tiene Nombre, La Tiendita de la Esquina, among many others.

During this time, he also started working with the political satire and comedy group Los Rayos Gamma, together with journalist Eddie López. The group still performs at theaters occasionally, and in the '80s and '90s had several shows on television. In theatre, he has starred in over 30 plays, and he has written and directed five.

In the 1970s, he performed in Hollywood productions such as Woody Allen's Bananas and Up the Sandbox with Barbra Streisand.

His first directing work was the film Dios los cría... in 1980. The film was an important event in the Puerto Rican film history and received several awards. It was also selected as one of the 25 most significant films of Latin America. He followed it with Nicolás y los demás in which he also had the starring role. For this performance he received the Best Actor Award at the Cartagena de Indias Festival in Colombia, 1986. His third film, Lo que le pasó a Santiago, was nominated for the Academy Award for Best Foreign Language Film in 1990. In 1994, he followed it with Linda Sara which starred singer Chayanne and former Miss Universe Dayanara Torres. The film received the Award for Best Artistic Contribution at the Latin American Film Festival from Trieste, Italy; the People's Choice Award at the Mar del Plata Festival in Argentina; and the Best Script and Best Music Award at the Latin American Film Festival in New York City.

In 2004, Morales directed Dios los cría II,  the sequel to his first film, broadcast by WIPR-TV in Puerto Rico. In 2007, his Angel, a full-length feature film, was released to much critical praise. It was considered for submission for the 80th Academy Awards but it lost to Maldeamores in a voting of the Puerto Rico Film Corporation.

Filmography

Actor
La Criada Malcriada (1965), also writer
Bananas (1971), with Woody Allen
Up the Sandbox (1972), with Barbra Streisand (played Fidel Castro)
Dios los cría (1979)
Nicolás y los demás (1986)
Lo que le pasó a Santiago (1989)
Los cuentos de Abelardo (1990), 'Peyo Mercé teaches English' segment, based on stories written by Abelardo Díaz Alfaro
Linda Sara (1994)
The Effects of Magic  (1998)
 Angelito mio (1998)Desandando la Vida (2003)Dios los cría II (2004)Ángel (2007)Broche de Oro (2012)Broche de Oro: Comienzos (2017)

Director/WriterDios los cría (1979)Nicolás y los demás (1986)Lo que le pasó a Santiago (1989), with Tommy Muñiz & Gladys RodríguezLinda Sara (1994), with Chayanne & Dayanara TorresDios los cría II (2004)Ángel'' (2007)

See also
List of Puerto Ricans
Cinema of Puerto Rico
List of Puerto Ricans in the Academy Awards
Lo que le pasó a Santiago
Gladys Rodríguez
Tommy Muñiz
Chayanne
Raulito Carbonell

References

External links

1934 births
Living people
People from Lajas, Puerto Rico
Puerto Rican comedians
Puerto Rican male film actors
Puerto Rican male stage actors
Puerto Rican radio actors
Puerto Rican male television actors
Puerto Rican television personalities
Puerto Rican film directors